The Guardians Brotherhood is a socio-civic service fraternity established in the Philippines in 1976. It is considered as one of the biggest and most respected fraternity in the country, with members mainly coming from the police/military, government, law, judiciary, and security sector. At present, there are numerous factions and branches carrying the name "Guardians," which are all under the umbrella of the Guardians Brotherhood organization. All of the branches stemmed to the Diablo Squad which was founded by Sgt. Leborio "GMF Abraham" Jangao Jr along with ten other members from the then Philippine Constabulary (now Philippine National Police). The group, which started off as a military fraternal organization, eventually took in civilian members in 1980 with the so-called Magic Group or Magic Five, which is composed of prosecutors and lawyers. In 1984, the then Diablo Squad Crime Busters changed and registered under the name Guardians Brotherhood Inc.

Founding

The Guardians Brotherhood Organization was first known as the "Diablo Squad" (DS) organization in 1976 and originally had 11 members with Sgt. Leborio "GMF Abraham" Jangao, Jr. as its founder. As detachment commander at that time in Sitio Kidama, Parang, Maguindanao, Sgt Jangao conceived the DS as a fraternity of soldiers carrying with them the symbol of strong Brotherhood, Unity, Solidarity and Oneness and with these principles, he was able to convince his men to join the group.

In 1979, Sgt. Jangao met Capt. Gil "Lapu-Lapu" Taojo, Jr. and Capt. Anastacio "Patton" Labitad of the Philippine Army, in Lanao del Norte and recruited them into the fraternity. In 1981 the DS was renamed into Diablo Squad the Crime Busters (DSCB) with Lt. Gil ‘SGF Lapulapu” Taojo Jr drafted the original Constitution and By-laws of the DSCB. Moreover, the original Magic Group known as the Magic 5 was organized as the first civilian members of the DS Crime Buster. They were all lawyers that served as the Advisory Group of the DSCB Organization.

The DSCB was eventually registered under the name Diablo Squad Brotherhood Association Inc in 1984.

At the time, the group was considered a threat to national security being “An Army within the Army” with more or less 25,000 members from the Armed Forces of the Philippines and Integrated National Police (now Philippine National Police). Then LtGen.Fidel V. Ramos engineered the disbandment of the group. The officers renamed and registered the group as Guardians Brotherhood Inc.(GBI) with SEC Reg No. 123899 on December 10, 1984. Its Constitution and By-Laws was authored by Taojo.

Subsequently, the Guardians Centre Foundation Inc. (GCFI) was created as financial arm of GBI to generate funds and or extend assistance to the members who are financially handicapped and the widows of members who died in combat. In 1986, some misguided elements of the AFP and members of GBI (Guardians Luzon) were deployed by RAM SFP YOU led by Col. Gregorio Honasan in a series of coup d’ etat against the administration of the late President Ferdinand Marcos and President Corazon Aquino. 

The GCFI, without prior approval of the GBI hierarchy, was registered with SEC Reg. No. 132118 in 1986, with Honasan as one of the incorporators. This misled some of its members about the existence of GBI, with the GCFI becoming the first “breakaway group” from the mother fraternal association. 

Later in 1987, persecution against the GBI members by some unscrupulous Officers became especially during the time of General Rodolfo Biazon as Chief of Staff of the AFP. Some unscrupulous field commanders in Mindanao particularly in the Army Commands strictly and severely enforced the directive of the Higher Command that non–erasures of GBI markings shall mean non–reenlistment into the Regular Force of the AFP. Sensing the immediate needs of the GBI's Organic members' (uniformed men and women in the AFP/PNP) protection, the group's Region XI Chapter hierarchy called for a Regional Convention sometime in 1989 purposely to circumvent the said unabated worsening situation. The focal point of the said amendment was centered on the conversion of the GBI organization from a military fraternity to a civilian–led organization known as a non-governmental organization similar to some other civilian organizations. 

Sometime on May 11, 1991, MFGF Leborio “Abraham” Jangao Jr called for a conference at Sta Ana Central Fire Station, Davao City purposely to implement the Constitution and Bylaws of the TRIAD: DSCB, GBI and GMG, wherein Guardians Philippines Inc.(GPI) later became the umbrella organization without the benefit of SEC approval or the amendments of the original GBI and/or new registration.

In the year 2000, then Senator Gringo Honasan, the Interim National Chairman for Guardians Unification, hosted another National Guardians Unification Convention in Pasay City.

The result of the attempt to unify all factions of the Guardians or Guardians Unification, was the establishment of the Philippine Guardians Brotherhood Inc. (PGBI). Unfortunately, the original Founders opposed the Constitution and Bylaws of the PGBI as almost 85% of its provisions were copied from the PGI version promulgated during the Davao National convention for Guardians Unification. Under the PGBI Constitution and Bylaws the role and functions of the Founders are just mere advisers only and cannot hold vital or key positions in the Administration of the PGBI. Hence, adverse reaction from the Original Founders particularly FSGF Gil “Lapulapu” Taojo Jr who was greatly disappointed on the outcome of the said Constitution and Bylaws supposedly for Guardians Unification. Hence, more branches and factions arise in the later years all bearing the name of the "Guardians."

Notable members 
 Rodrigo "MG Charlie Mike" Duterte - 16th President of the Republic of the Philippines, former Mayor of Davao City, and lawyer.

 Col. Gregorio "GSGF Gringo" Honasan– Secretary of Department of Information and Communications Technology, politician, and former military officer.

 Gen.Danilo "PCGS Delta" Lim – former Chairman of the Metropolitan Manila Development Authority and former military officer.

 PGen. Guillermo "NFSGGF Supremo Guillor" Eleazar - former PNP Chief 

 Jesus Dureza – former Presidential Peace Adviser, lawyer, and broadcast journalist.

 Manny "RMG Destroyer" Pacquiao – professional boxer and politician.

 Francis "SGF Chiz" Escudero – former Governor of Sorsogon, senator, and a lawyer. 

 PGen. Avelino "SGF Dragon" Razon Jr – former Philippine National Police chief.

 Sgt. Leborio "GMF Abraham" Jangao Jr - Father of All Guardians

 Sen. Lito "FRMG Leon Guerrero" Lapid- senator and actor

 PGen. Reynaldo "SGF Cobra" Berroya - Undersecretary of Department of Transportation (Philippines), administrator of Light Rail Transit Authority, and police officer.

 Cong. Paolo Duterte - Congressman and former vice mayor of Davao City.

Affiliated Groups

 Guardians Brotherhood Inc.(GBI)

 Philippine Guardians Brotherhood Inc. (PGBI)

 Guardians Centre Foundation Inc. (GCFI)
 Guardians Philippine International Inc. Anti Crime Org. (GPII ACO)

 Guardians Brotherhood International Inc. (GBII)

 RAM Guardians Brotherhood Inc. (RGBI)

 Universal Guardians Brotherhood (UGB)

 Guardians Brotherhood Party List (1GB)

 Supreme Community Guardians Brotherhood International Inc. (SCGBII)
 1984 Guardians Brotherhood Incorporated (1984GBI)
 NEW BREED GUARDIANS BROTHERHOOD INCORPORATED (NBGBI)

See also 
Freemasonry
Fraternal Order of Eagles
Reform the Armed Forces Movement
Philippine National Police
Armed Forces of the Philippines
List of fraternities and sororities in the Philippines

References

Student societies in the Philippines
Fraternities and sororities in the Philippines
Student organizations established in 1968
1968 establishments in the Philippines